Puranmal (died 19 January 1534) was a sixteenth-century ruler of Amber.

Life
Puranmal inherited the throne after the death of his father, Prithviraj Singh I, in 1527. His succession may have been based on the fact that his mother, a daughter of Rao Lunkaran of Bikaner, had been Prithviraj's favourite wife. His ascension was controversial and the cause of an internecine dispute among the Kachwahas, a situation which was worsened when neighbouring rulers began taking advantage of the internal conflict. It was in these circumstances that it is claimed the Mughal emperor Humayun lent his aid to Puranmal.

Some sources state that later Puranmal took a policy of submission in regards to the Mughals and fought alongside them, thus initiating the long relationship between Amber and the Mughal empire. According to the Akbarnama, Puranmal died in the Battle of Mandrail in 1534, fighting under Humayun's brother Hindal Mirza against Tatar Khan. However, other sources disagree with this, instead stating that he was killed whilst battling against Hindal. This is said to have resulted from the Mughal prince making incursions into the territory of Puranmal's kinsman, Raimal, for whom the Raja died fighting in the Battle of Anaseri. Yet another version states that Puranmal was overthrown by his brother Bhim Singh, who then seized the throne.

Regardless, it was Bhim Singh who succeeded Puranmal, rather than the latter's sons. His descendants later formed the Puranmalot sub-clan, one of the "twelve chambers" of the House of Kachwaha.

Notes

References

Maharajas of Jaipur
1534 deaths
Year of birth unknown
People from Jaipur district